Josh Pearson (born June 13, 1997) is an American gridiron football wide receiver for the BC Lions of the Canadian Football League (CFL).

College career
Pearson played college football for the Jacksonville State Gamecocks from 2017 to 2019.

Professional career

Tampa Bay Buccaneers
Pearson was signed by the Tampa Bay Buccaneers as an undrafted free agent on May 4, 2020. He was waived on September 5, 2020, during final roster cuts, but was signed to the team's practice squad the following day. He was elevated to the active roster on October 8 for the team's week 5 game against the Chicago Bears, and reverted to the practice squad after the game. He was released on December 21, 2020, and re-signed to the practice squad two days later. On February 9, 2021, Pearson re-signed with the Buccaneers. He was waived on August 15, 2021.

BC Lions
On January 13, 2022, Pearson signed with BC Lions. Following training camp, he was placed on the injured list, but then made his CFL debut in the team's third game of the 2022 season, on June 30, 2022, against the Ottawa Redblacks, where he had one catch for seven yards. In the following game, he scored his first touchdown on a 66-yard pass from Nathan Rourke on July 9, 2022, against the Winnipeg Blue Bombers. Following this game, he was transferred to the injured list. While on the injured list, he was the anthem singer for the team's game on September 24, 2022, against the Calgary Stampeders.

Personal life
Pearson was born to parents Kristie Carter and Harold Pearson and has four siblings, Jacob, Christy, Shell, Akeli.

References

External links
BC Lions bio
Jacksonville State Gamecocks bio
Tampa Bay Buccaneers bio

1997 births
Living people
Players of American football from Alabama
Sportspeople from Decatur, Alabama
African-American players of American football
American football wide receivers
Jacksonville State Gamecocks football players
Tampa Bay Buccaneers players
21st-century African-American sportspeople
BC Lions players
Canadian football wide receivers
American players of Canadian football